Layla and Majnun is a classical Arabic story. 

Layla and Majnun, Leyli and Majnun, or Laila Majnu may also refer to:

Literature
 "Layla and Majnun" (Nizami Ganjavi poem), a 12th-century poem by Nizami Ganjavi
 "Layla and Majnun", a 15th-century poem by Jami
 "Layla and Majnun", a 15th-century poem by Ali-Shir Nava'i
 "Leyli and Majnun" (Fuzuli), a 15th–16th-century poem by Fuzûlî
 "Layla and Majnun", a poem by Hagiri Tabrizi; see

Music
 Leyli and Majnun (opera), a 1908 Azerbaijani opera by Uzeyir Hajibeyov
 Leyli and Majnun, a 1947 symphonic poem by Gara Garayev
 Leyli and Majnun (ballet), a 1969 Azerbaijani ballet by Gara Garayev

Films
 Laila Majnu (1922 film), an Indian Hindi silent film with Patience Cooper
 Laila Majnu, a 1927 Indian Hindi silent film produced by Excelsior Pictures and directed by Manilal Joshi
 Laila Majnu (1931 Krishnatone film), a 1931 Hindi film produced by Krishnatone and directed by K. Rathod
 Laila Majnu (1931 Madan film), a 1931 Hindi film produced by Madan Theatres and directed by J. J. Madan
 Leila Majnun, a 1933 film directed by B. S. Rajhans
 Layla and Majnun (1937 film), a 1937 Iranian film
 Laila Majnu (1949 film), an Indian Telugu film
 Laila Majnu (1950 film), an Indian Tamil-language film
 Laila Majnu, a 1953 Indian Hindi film with Shammi Kapoor
 , a 1956 film starring Mahvash
 Lela Manja, a 1960 Malay Film Productions film
 Laila Majnu (1962 film), an Indian Malayalam-language film
 Laila Majnu (1976 film), an Indian Hindi film
 Laila Majnu (2018 film), an Indian Hindi film by Imtiyaz Ali

Other
 Laila Majnu Ki Mazar, mausoleum of Laila and Majnu, Binjaur village, Rajasthan, India
 Leyla ile Mecnun, a Turkish comedy series
 Layla and Majnun, a Persian miniature painting by Mir Sayyid Ali

See also
 Layla (disambiguation)
 Majnu (disambiguation)
 Leyla and Mecnun, a Turkish television series